Kwak Dae-Sung is a retired South Korean judoka who is a two-time Asian champion (1996 and 1997).

He won a silver medal in the lightweight division at the 1996 Summer Olympics, and also won silver at the 1995 World Judo Championships.

External links
Database Olympics

Living people
Judoka at the 1996 Summer Olympics
Olympic judoka of South Korea
Olympic silver medalists for South Korea
Olympic medalists in judo
Year of birth missing (living people)
South Korean male judoka
Medalists at the 1996 Summer Olympics
20th-century South Korean people